Carallia euryoides is a species of plant in the Rhizophoraceae family that is endemic to Peninsular Malaysia. It is threatened by habitat loss.

References

euryoides
Endemic flora of Peninsular Malaysia
Trees of Peninsular Malaysia
Near threatened plants
Taxonomy articles created by Polbot